Euaresta reticulata is a species of fruit fly in the genus Euaresta of the family Tephritidae.

Distribution
Colombia, Ecuador, Peru, Bolivia.

References

Tephritinae
Insects described in 1914
Diptera of South America